Joni Pitkänen (born 19 September 1983) is a Finnish former professional ice hockey defenceman who played in the National Hockey League (NHL) for the Philadelphia Flyers, Edmonton Oilers, and Carolina Hurricanes.

Playing career
Pitkänen started his pro hockey career in the Kärpät organization in the Finnish SM-liiga. After three seasons there he crossed the Atlantic to play for the Philadelphia Flyers, who drafted him in the 2002 NHL Entry Draft with their first round draft pick (fourth overall). After a good opening season that saw Pitkänen cement his place on the team lineup, he played for the Philadelphia Phantoms during the 2004–05 NHL lockout when the team won the Calder Cup. When the NHL resumed in 2005, Pitkänen returned to the Flyers and became the team's top-scoring defenseman, recording 46 points in 58 games. However, he was hampered by injuries during the second half of the season.

When Joni Pitkänen came to the United States to play for the Philadelphia Flyers, he hardly spoke a word of English, so teammate and fellow Finn Sami Kapanen translated for him, and eventually taught him English.

On 14 July 2006, Pitkänen signed a one-year, $2 million contract with Philadelphia. A key member of the Flyers' powerplay unit, Pitkänen was tied for second in powerplay scoring in 2006–07 with 1+17=18 and led Philadelphia in powerplay assists. During his rookie season, Pitkänen was ranked second among NHL rookies in powerplay points (5+12=17) and powerplay assists. The 23-year-old defenseman led in ice time in each of the last two seasons with Philadelphia.

Pitkänen was ranked among the NHL’s top 25 defensemen in scoring in each of the first two seasons following the 2004–05 NHL lockout. His 43 points in 2006–07 ranked him 22nd, while his career-high 13+33=46 in 2005–06 placed him 19th. He was also among the 2006–07 NHL blueline leaders in assists (16th) and ice time (20th with 24:32 minutes per-game).

On 1 July 2007, Pitkänen was traded to the Edmonton Oilers along with Geoff Sanderson and a third round draft choice in the 2009 NHL Entry Draft in exchange for Jason Smith and Joffrey Lupul. On 20 July 2007, Pitkänen signed a one-year contract with the Oilers. With the Oilers, Pitkänen scored 8+18=26 in 63 games.

On 1 July 2008, Pitkänen was traded to the Carolina Hurricanes in exchange for Erik Cole. On 2 July 2008, Pitkänen signed a three-year, $12 million contract with the Carolina Hurricanes as a restricted free agent.

Pitkänen missed the entire 2013-14 season, his last under contract to the Hurricanes, with a broken heel.

In early December 2014 it was reported that Pitkänen had started light training with Oulun Kärpät of the Finnish Liiga, skating for the first time since his injury.

On February 5, 2016, it was announced that Pitkänen had signed a deal with Oulun Kärpät for the rest of the season. He played his first game in almost three years on February 6 against KalPa. On February 25, 2016, Pitkänen announced he would retire once more from ice-hockey after playing three games with Oulun Kärpät.

Career statistics

Regular season and playoffs

International

Awards
2003–04: All-Rookie Team (NHL)
2003–04: Played in the YoungStars Game (NHL)
2004–05: Calder Cup (Philadelphia Phantoms)
2005–06: Barry Ashbee Trophy (Philadelphia Flyers)
2005–06: Pelle Lindbergh Memorial (Philadelphia Flyers)

References

External links

 

1983 births
Carolina Hurricanes players
Edmonton Oilers players
Finnish ice hockey defencemen
Ice hockey players at the 2010 Winter Olympics
Oulun Kärpät players
Living people
National Hockey League first-round draft picks
Olympic bronze medalists for Finland
Olympic ice hockey players of Finland
Sportspeople from Oulu
Philadelphia Flyers draft picks
Philadelphia Flyers players
Philadelphia Phantoms players
Olympic medalists in ice hockey
Medalists at the 2010 Winter Olympics